The Welsh Rugby Union Division Four West (also called the SWALEC Division Four West for sponsorship reasons) is a rugby union league in Wales first implemented for the 1995/96 season.

Competition
There are 12 clubs in the WRU Division Four West. During the course of a season (which lasts from September to May) each club plays the others twice, once at their home ground and once at the Hpme ground of their opponents for a total of 22 games for each club, with a total of 132 games in each season. Teams receive four points for a win and two point for a draw, an additional bonus point is awarded to either team if they score four tries or more in a single match. No points are awarded for a loss though the losing team can gain a bonus point for finishing the match within seven points of the winning team. Teams are ranked by total points, then the number of tries scored and then points difference. At the end of each season, the club with the most points is crowned as champion. If points are equal the tries scored then points difference determines the winner. The team who is declared champion at the end of the season is eligible for promotion to the WRU Division Three West. The two lowest placed teams are relegated into the WRU Division Five West.

Sponsorship 
In 2008 the Welsh Rugby Union announced a new sponsorship deal for the club rugby leagues with SWALEC valued at £1 million (GBP). The initial three year sponsorship was extended at the end of the 2010/11 season, making SWALEC the league sponsors until 2015. The leagues sponsored are the WRU Divisions one through to seven.

 (2002-2005) Lloyds TSB
 (2005-2008) Asda
 (2008-2015) SWALEC

2010/2011 season

League teams
 Aberaeron RFC
 Amman United RFC
 Betws RFC
 Cardigan RFC
 Cefneithin RFC
 Hendy RFC
 Llanybydder RFC
 Milford Haven RFC
 Neyland RFC
 Pembroke Dock Harlequins RFC
 Tenby United RFC
 Trimsaran RFC

2009/2010 season

League teams
 Amman United RFC
 Betws RFC
 Burry Port RFC
 Cefneithin RFC
 Hendy RFC
 Milford Haven RFC
 Pembroke RFC
 Pembroke Dock Harlequins RFC
 Pontarddulais RFC
 Tenby United RFC
 Trimsaran RFC
 Tumble RFC

2009/2010 Table

2008/2009 season

League teams
 Betws RFC
 Brynamman RFC
 Burry Port RFC
 Cwmgors RFC
 Hendy RFC
 Llandeilo RFC
 Pembroke RFC
 Pembroke Dock Harlequins RFC
 Pontarddulais RFC
 Tenby United RFC
 Trimsaran RFC
 Tycroes RFC

2008/2009 Table

2007/2008 season

League Teams 
 Birchgrove RFC
 Crymych RFC
 Hendy RFC
 Llandeilo RFC
 Milford Haven RFC
 Morriston RFC
 Neyland RFC
 Pembroke RFC
 Pontarddulais RFC
 Tenby United RFC
 Trimsaran RFC
 Tycroes RFC

2007/2008 Table

References

6